Robert Gilmour may refer to:

Sir Robert Gilmour, 1st Baronet (1857–1939), British army officer
Robert Gilmour (footballer), Scottish footballer
Robert Gilmour (journalist) (1831–1902), Scottish-New Zealander editor, newspaper proprietor and journalist

See also

Robert Gillmor (1936–2022), British author and artist
Robert Gilmore (disambiguation)